The 1995–96 I-Divisioona season was the 22nd season of the I-Divisioona, the second level of Finnish ice hockey. 16 teams participated in the league, and Hermes Kokkola and SaiPa Lappeenranta qualified for the promotion/relegation round of the SM-liiga.

Regular season

Playoffs

First round

 Kiekko-67 - Haukat 2:3
 Haukat - Kiekko-67 4:5
 Haukat - Kiekko-67 4:5

Second round

 1st games
 Hermes - SaPKo 2:1
 SaiPa - K-Karhut 8:4
 Kiekko-67 - FoPS 2:5
 2nd games
 SaPKo - Hermes 11:1
 K-Karhut - SaiPa 2:4
 FoPS - Kiekko-67 5:4
 3rd games
 Hermes - SaPKo 6:1
 SaiPa - K-Karhut 6:1
 Kiekko-67 - FoPS 2:7

External links 
 Season on hockeyarchives.info

I-Divisioona seasons
Fin
2